"Do It Like Me" (formally titled as "Bet You Can't Do It Like Me") is the debut single by American rapper DLOW. The song samples the instrumental of "Knuck If You Buck" by Crime Mob and the hook from "Betcha Can't Do It Like Me" by D4L It reached number 45 on the U.S. Billboard Hot 100.

Music video
DLOW released a dance video for this song on YouTube on September 29, 2015.

The official music video was released on May 18, 2016 on DLOW's YouTube account.

Charts

References

2015 debut singles
2015 songs
American hip hop songs